Gaurav Chakrabarty is an Indian Bengali film and television actor best known for his portrayal of the character Prodipto Lahiri in the Bengali musical TV series Gaaner Oparey that aired on Star Jalsha from 28 June 2010 to 16 April 2011. Chakrabarty is also known for acting in the Bengali classic periodic thriller TV series Byomkesh (2014-2015), where he played the role of iconic Bengali detective Byomkesh Bakshi. He hails from a family which has had a legacy of association with the Bengali cultural arena, starting from Jochhon Dastidar and Chandra Dastidar (his paternal great uncle and aunt), Bijon Bhattacharya (his paternal great uncle), Jagadish Chandra Chakrabarty & Monika Chakrabarty (his paternal grandparents), and his parents Sabyasachi Chakrabarty & Mithu Chakrabarty. He debuted on the big screen Kaushik Ganguly's Rang Milanti one of the most appreciated films of the year 2011.

He is part of the ensemble cast of the ZEE5 cop drama web series, Lalbazaar.

Calcutta Times voted him as one of the 10 Most Desirable Men in 2015.

Education
Chakrabarty had his schooling at the Assembly of God Church School in Kolkata. He subsequently earned a degree in Mass Communication and Videography from St. Xavier's College, Kolkata and completed his postgraduation in Video Editing from Film and Television Institute of India at Pune.

Early life
Gaurav got involved in theatre from a young age as part of the group Charbak, where he not only assisted in the backstage work (audio technician in the play Rong, Doodh Kheyechhe Meow and the runaway success Cholo Potol Tuli), but also acted as 'Topshe' in the play Apsara Theatre-er Mamla based on Satyajit Ray's thriller of the same name, under the direction of his father, who himself played the role of Feluda. During his St. Xavier days, he played the lead in a documentary on HIV-Aids, Isolation, by teenage filmmaker Sangbit Samaddar, who was at that time, only a Class 12 student of South Point High School.

His acting debut on the small screen happened post his FTII stint, when he was given a small role in the telefilm BaghNokh by Kaushik Ganguly, which aired on ETV Bangla as part of a weekly series.However, his claim to fame was through the critically acclaimed Bengali musical TV series Gaaner Oparey which also saw the debut of his sibling Arjun Chakrabarty as the male lead Gora.

Career

Gaurav debuted on television, along with his younger sibling Arjun Chakrabarty, in the Star Jalsha megaserial Gaaner Oparey produced by Ideas Creations Pvt. Ltd, the production company helmed by the Tollywood hero Prosenjit Chatterjee. Gaaner Oparey was conceived by the channel as a tribute to the poet laureate Rabindranath Tagore on his 150th birth anniversary, and would explore his applicability in the increasingly Westernized modern Bengali society.With a script penned initially by actor and director Rituparno Ghosh and later by Anuja Chattopadhyay (who had previously worked on other serials like Ekhane Aakash Neel), the serial is widely credited for having brought back the educated Tagore-loving, intellectual Bengali audience in front of the television. Even though it ran for only about ten months, the show catapulted the young cast, primarily Gaurav, Arjun and Mimi Chakrabarty (who played the female lead) to fame within that short span of time. Chakrabarty's character 'Prodipto Lahiri', in spite of not being the official male lead, found a cult following, largely due to its controlled and understated portrayal.

Gaurav made his silver screen debut with the film Rang Milanti, a romantic comedy directed by Kaushik Ganguly, that released in September 2011 to wide critical and commercial acclaim. He played the character 'Rik', a serious and docile software engineer in love with an ad-agency employee Kamalika (Ridhima Ghosh). He also featured in the ensemble cast for Kaushik's movie, Laptop (released on 13 April 2012), which was selected for screening at the Indian Panorama section of the 42nd International Film Festival of India at Goa (IFFI 2011: 23 Nov. – 3 Dec.). The film also had an international premiere at the Dubai International Film Festival (DIFF 2011), where it competed for the Muhr AsiaAfrica Awards for feature films. Laptop found Gaurav in the garb of a computer science master's student Jiyon, who also doubled up as the personal tutor of Ridhima Ghosh's character Raya, an aspiring model. That apart, he plays a Muslim lad Anwar, in love with a singer Kuhu (Ridhima Ghosh again), in Abhijit Dasgupta's Aashbo Aar Ekdin, co-directed by Arindam Sil. The ensemble cast has other big names like Abir Chatterjee, Swastika Mukherjee, Roopa Ganguly, Alokananda Roy, and others. He also appears as Indrajit Pratap Roy in Haranath Chakraborty's Chhayamoy based on Shirshendu Mukhopadhyay's story of the same name, and as Prasit in Atanu Ghosh's upcoming directorial venture (his fourth overall on big screen) Rupkatha Noy.

Besides films, Gaurav has been keeping up with his theatre work and can be seen regularly as 'Topshe' in Apsara Theatre-er Mamla. He also starred in the Star Jalsha tele-serial Adwitiya which wrapped up recently (2 March 2012). There, he played the role of Robi Kiran Choudhury, the elder brother to protagonist Chandra Kiran Choudhury, played by Indrasish Roy. Robi Kiran, a far cry from the likes of Prodipto and Rik, was a power-hungry but educated village chief, whose life was governed by the schemes he designed to establish and maintain his political and social supremacy over his native village in the Sundarbans.

Filmography

Television

Theatre

Short films and web series

As editor

Podcast

Audio drama

TVCs

Awards and nominations

References

External links

 
 

Living people
Indian male film actors
Male actors from Kolkata
Bengali male actors
Bengali Hindus
Male actors in Bengali cinema
St. Xavier's College, Kolkata alumni
University of Calcutta alumni
Film and Television Institute of India alumni
Bengali male television actors
Indian male television actors
21st-century Indian male actors
1987 births